Máscara Dorada (born August 24, 1988) is the ring name of a Mexican luchador enmascarado (masked professional wrestler) currently working for All Elite Wrestling (AEW) and New Japan Pro-Wrestling (NJPW). He also regularly performs on the weekly shows of Ring of Honor, AEW's sister promotion under the ring name Metalik. He is best known for his time in WWE where he performed under the ring name Gran Metalik, as a member of Lucha House Party.

His real name has not been officially documented, a tradition in Mexican lucha libre where masked wrestlers' real names often are not a matter of public record. In Mexico and Japan, he is best known for his decade-long stint in Consejo Mundial de Lucha Libre under the ring name "Máscara Dorada". He made his debut in 2005, originally using the masked persona Plata II. He later used the ring name Metalik, holding the local Occidente Welterweight Championship, but abandoned the championship when he adopted the Máscara Dorada character. The "Máscara Dorada" character was the first instance of a regular-sized luchador being given a character based on a Mini-Estrella as he was introduced after CMLL introduced Mascarita Dorada in 2007. At one time, Dorada was a quadruple CMLL champion, holding the Mexican National Trios Championship, the CMLL World Trios Championship, the CMLL World Super Lightweight Championship, and the CMLL World Welterweight Championship at the same time. He has held the CMLL World Welterweight Championship four times. After a decade of working for CMLL in his native Mexico, Dorada worked full-time for the Japanese promotion New Japan Pro-Wrestling (NJPW) from January 2015 until returning to CMLL a year later in February 2016.

In the summer of 2016, he competed in the American promotion WWE's Cruiserweight Classic tournament. After the tournament, he signed with WWE and was assigned to their brand 205 Live, he has since teamed with Kalisto and Lince Dorado as part of Lucha House Party. They were promoted to the Raw brand in November 2018, but was moved to the SmackDown brand in October 2019. He would depart WWE in November 2021 after requesting his release and subsequently returned to the independent circuit.

Early life
He was born on November 3, 1988, in Guadalajara, Jalisco, Mexico. Since he has not been unmasked by losing a Lucha de Apuestas ("Bet match"), his given name is not a matter of public record. The secrecy around masked wrestlers is a large part of lucha libre tradition, with Mexican newspapers not reporting masked wrestlers real names.

Professional wrestling career

Consejo Mundial de Lucha Libre (2005–2016)

Early career (2005–2008)
He made his professional wrestling debut on July 14, 2005, after training with Gran Cochisse and El Satánico. His initial ring persona was that of Plata II, a copy of the original Plata that wrestled in the early to mid-1990s. His run as Plata II was brief as he was repackaged as Metalik, a variation of the "metal-based" look that he had used as "Plata II". As Metalik he worked mainly for Consejo Mundial de Lucha Libre's (CMLL; Spanish for "World Wrestling Council") Guadalajara branch, getting experience while working on a local level. On April 13, 2008, the CMLL bookers had Metalik defeat El Depredador to become the Occidente Welterweight Champion. About a month later, Metalik won his first-ever Luchas de Apuestas match, winning the hair of Jeque. Metalik was entered in the 2008 Torneo Gran Alternativa, where a newcomer teams up with a veteran, and he teamed up with Dos Caras Jr. to make it to the finals before losing to Último Guerrero and Dragón Rojo Jr.

Máscara Dorada  (2008–2016)
In 2007, CMLL signed Mascarita Sagrada 2000 but were not allowed to call him that as a rival promotion owned the trademark to the name. Instead, CMLL chose to repackage the mini luchador as Mascarita Dorada. The gimmick and the wrestler proved so successful, that in the fall of 2008, CMLL announced that they were creating a "large" version of Mascarita Dorada. Traditionally the minis were often patterned after existing Luchadors, but this time the mini was created before the "regular-sized" luchador. On November 7, 2008, Metalik was repackaged and made his debut as Máscara Dorada ("Golden Mask"), helping his team defeat the trio of Averno, Mephisto, and Ephesto. CMLL stripped Rocky Romero of the CMLL World Super Lightweight Championship and announced that a tournament to crown the new champion would take place on April 7, 2009. On the night Máscara Dorada won a Tornero Cibernetico outlasting nine other wrestlers to become the CMLL Super Lightweight Champion. Since he held a CMLL title, Dorada was entered into CMLL's inaugural "Universal Championship" tournament but was eliminated in the first round by Black Warrior. On December 19, 2009, it was announced by the Comisión de Box y Lucha Libre Mexico D.F. that Poder Mexica (Black Warrior, Sangre Azteca, and Dragón Rojo Jr.) had been stripped of the Mexican National Trios Championship because Black Warrior had left CMLL. At the same time, they announced an eight-team tournament to crown a new trios champion. The top half of the bracket took place on December 22, 2009, and the bottom half of the bracket took place on December 29. In the top bracket, Máscara Dorada teamed with Stuka Jr. and Metro for the first time and defeated Los Guerreros Tuareg (Arkangel de la Muerte, Loco Max, and Skándalo) in the first round and Los Cancerberos del Infierno (Virus, Euforia, and Pólvora) in the second round to qualify for the finals. The bottom bracket took place on December 29, 2009, and the team of the new Poder Mexica (Sangre Azteca, Dragón Rojo Jr., and Misterioso Jr.) qualified for the final.

Máscara Dorada, Stuka Jr., and Metro defeated Poder Mexica in the finals of the tournament to become the new Mexican National Trios Champions, making Dorada a double champion. Later that month Máscara Dorada teamed up with Atlantis to participate in CMLL's Torneo Nacional de Parejas Increibles ("National Amazing Pairs tournament"), a tournament where CMLL teams up a Tecnico (Dorada) and a Rudo (Atlantis) for a tournament. The two defeated Dragón Rojo and La Sombra in the opening round, Mr. Niebla and Máximo in the second round, and Místico and Averno in the semi-final to earn a spot in the final of the tournament. During the tournament Atlantis wore his old Tecnico white mask, acting and wrestling a tecnico style. Dorada and Atlantis defeated Negro Casas and La Máscara in the finals two weeks later to win the tournament.

On May 14, 2010, Máscara Dorada teamed up with La Sombra and La Máscara to defeat the then CMLL World Trios Champions La Ola Amarilla (Hiroshi Tanahashi, Okumura, and Taichi) in a non-title match to earn a shot at the titles the following week. One week later the trio defeated Ola Amarilla again, ending the Japanese trios title reign after just two weeks. By virtue of holding three CMLL championships, Máscara Dorada participated in the 2010 Universal Championship tournament. Stuka Jr. was part of "Block A" that competed on the July 30, 2010, Super Viernes show. He was the first wrestler eliminated in the seeding battle royal and then defeated his Mexican National Trios Championship partner Stuka Jr. in the first round of the actual tournament. Máscara Dorada was eliminated in the second round, losing to Último Guerrero. On September 7, 2010, Dorada defeated Negro Casas to win the CMLL World Welterweight Championship, making him a quadruple CMLL champion, the first-ever in the history of the promotion. On November 18, 2010, Dorada announced that he was relinquishing his hold of the Mexican National Trios Championship, which Metro and Stuka Jr. would continue to hold with a new partner.

Máscara Dorada's reign as  CMLL World Welterweight Champion ended during the 2011 Fantastica Mania, a CMLL and New Japan Pro-Wrestling co-promoted event, as he lost to Ryusuke Taguchi. A month later Máscara Dorada and Atlantis defeated Blue Panther and Dragón Rojo Jr. in the finals to win the Torneo Nacional de Parejas Increibles for the second year in a row. On April 7 Dorada vacated the CMLL World Super Lightweight Championship to move up to the middleweight division. After Dorada returned from Japan with the CMLL World Welterweight Championship, La Generación Dorada lost the CMLL World Trios Championship to Los Hijos del Averno (Averno, Ephesto and Mephisto), On November 11, 2012, Dorada lost the CMLL World Welterweight Championship to Pólvora during CMLL's Sunday night event in Arena Mexico.

Dorada defeated Negro Casas to win the NWA World Historic Welterweight Championship for the first time during the summer of 2013. On June 16, Dorada and his new Los Estetas del Aire ("Air Aesthetes") stable, formed with Místico and Valiente, won the CMLL World Trios Championship. Dorada's reign as the NWA World Historic Welterweight Champion ended in the fall of 2013 as he lost the championship to Volador Jr. On March 28, 2014, Los Estetas del Aire also lost the CMLL World Trios Championship.

In January 2015, Dorada defeated Negro Casas in the finals of a tournament to win the CMLL World Welterweight Championship for the third time. Later in the month, through CMLL's relationship with NJPW, Dorada signed a one-year contract with NJPW, leaving his Mexican home promotion. He returned to CMLL and had his first match in Mexico in over a year in February 2016. Three months after his return to CMLL Dorada's fourth reign as the CMLL World Welterweight Champion ended when Mephisto defeated him for the championship. On November 11, 2016, Dorada wrestled his last match for CMLL, teaming with Atlantis and Diamante Azul to defeat Bárbaro Cavernario, El Felino and Negro Casas.

New Japan Pro-Wrestling (2010–2016)

Various appearances (2010–2014)
In May 2010 Máscara Dorada and Valiente traveled to Japan to participate in New Japan Pro-Wrestling's first-ever Super J Tag Team tournament, marking  Máscara Dorada's Japanese debut. In the first round of the tournament, they lost to Ryusuke Taguchi and Prince Devitt in just under eight minutes. In November 2010 Máscara Dorada and La Sombra took part in New Japan's five-day-long Super J Tag League. After winning two out of their four matches in the group stage, Sombra and Dorada finished third in their block, missing the finals of the tournament. Dorada and Sombra returned to New Japan on January 4, 2011, at Wrestle Kingdom V in Tokyo Dome, where they defeated Jushin Thunder Liger and Héctor Garza in a tag team match.

Dorada returned to New Japan in April of that year teaming with Tama Tonga to defeat Liger and King Fale in a tag team match. Dorada worked a majority of the tour as a rudo, teaming with members of the Chaos stable. At Wrestling Dontaku 2011, Dorada unsuccessfully challenged Liger for the CMLL World Middleweight Championship. Dorada's extended tour of New Japan also included participation in the 2011 Best of the Super Juniors tournament in late May-early June. Dorada managed to win four out of his eight matches in the round-robin stage of the tournament, which included wins over Liger and CMLL World Welterweight Champion Ryusuke Taguchi and finished sixth out of the nine wrestlers in his block. On June 18 at New Japan's Dominion 6.18 show, Dorada defeated Taguchi to regain the CMLL World Welterweight Championship. Three days later Dorada entered the J Sports Crown Openweight 6 Man Tag Tournament, teaming with IWGP Heavyweight Champion Hiroshi Tanahashi and KUSHIDA, with the team defeating Brian Kendrick, Gedo, and Jado in their first-round match. The following day the trio was eliminated from the tournament in the second round by Giant Bernard, Jushin Thunder Liger, and Karl Anderson. Dorada's tour of New Japan ended the following day, when he, Tanahashi, Hiroyoshi Tenzan, Tiger Mask, and Wataru Inoue were defeated in a ten-man tag team match by Chaos (Dick Togo, Gedo, Jado, Masato Tanaka, and Yujiro Takahashi).

On January 4, 2012, Dorada returned to New Japan at Wrestle Kingdom VI in Tokyo Dome, where he teamed with Jushin Thunder Liger, KUSHIDA and Tiger Mask to defeat Atlantis, Taichi, Taka Michinoku and Valiente in an eight-man tag team match. Dorada returned to Japan to take part in the Fantastica Mania 2012 events, teaming with Rush losing to the team of Hirooki Goto and KUSHIDA on the first night. The second night, Dorada successfully defended the CMLL World Welterweight Championship against KUSHIDA.

In January 2013, Dorada returned to Japan to take part in the three-day Fantastica Mania 2013 event. During the first night on January 18, he teamed with La Máscara and Máximo in a six-man tag team match, where they were defeated by Taichi, Taka Michinoku, and Volador Jr. The following night, Dorada and Diamante were defeated in a tag team match by Mephisto and Okumura. During the third and final night, Dorada took part in a twelve-man torneo cibernetico, from which he was the eighth man eliminated by Yoshi-Hashi and which was eventually won by Tomohiro Ishii. Dorada returned to New Japan on September 23, 2013, working the entire tour opposite the Bullet Club stable, which also included his fellow CMLL worker Rey Bucanero. Dorada's tour concluded on September 29 at the Destruction pay-per-view, where he pinned Bucanero in an eight-man tag team match, where he teamed with Captain New Japan, Togi Makabe, and Tomoaki Honma against Bucanero, Bad Luck Fale, Karl Anderson, and Tama Tonga. Dorada returned to Japan in January 2014, when he took part in the five-day Fantastica Mania 2014 tour. The tour concluded on January 19 with a main event, where Dorada unsuccessfully challenged Volador Jr. for the NWA World Historic Welterweight Championship. From April to July 2014, Dorada worked an extended tour with New Japan, which included a two-day tour of Taiwan, the Wrestling Dontaku 2014 tour, the 2014 Best of the Super Juniors, where he finished with a record of three wins and four losses and thus missed the semifinals of the tournament, and the Kizuna Road 2014 tour. On October 25, 2014, Dorada returned to NJPW, teaming up with Bushi for the 2014 Super Junior Tag Tournament. The team lost to reDRagon (Bobby Fish and Kyle O'Reilly) in the first round. Dorada remained with NJPW until November 8.

Full-time contract (2015–2016)
In January 2015, Dorada returned to Japan to take part in the Fantastica Mania 2015 tour, during which he and Atlantis won the Fantastica Mania 2015 Tag Tournament. Dorada's participation in the tour was built around a rivalry with La Sombra, which culminated in a singles match between the two on January 19, where La Sombra was victorious. During the final event, Dorada announced he had signed a one-year contract with NJPW. After doing interviews suggesting the unification of his CMLL World Welterweight Championship and the IWGP Junior Heavyweight Championship, Dorada entered the IWGP title picture by challenging reigning champion Kenny Omega on February 11 at The New Beginning in Osaka. He received his title shot at Invasion Attack 2015 but was defeated by Omega. The following month, Dorada entered the 2015 Best of the Super Juniors. He finished third in his block with a record of five wins and two losses, failing to advance to the finals of the tournament. On December 19, Dorada lost the CMLL World Welterweight Championship to Bushi following outside interference from Bushi's Los Ingobernables de Japón stablemate Evil. He regained the title from Bushi on January 22, 2016, at Fantastica Mania 2016. Dorada's final match under his NJPW contract took place two days later.

WWE (2016–2021)

Cruiserweight division (2016–2018)
On June 13, 2016, WWE announced Dorada, under the ring name Gran Metalik, as a participant in the upcoming Cruiserweight Classic tournament. In a subsequent interview, he revealed that he was only working the Cruiserweight Classic matches with WWE and was still full-time with CMLL beyond that and he credited Finn Bálor, who worked as Prince Devitt in NJPW, as being the reason he was invited to the tournament. The tournament began on June 23 with Metalik defeating Alejandro Saez in the first round match. He later defeated Tajiri in the second-round match. The following day, it was reported that he had signed a full-time contract with WWE. On August 26, Metalik defeated Akira Tozawa to advance at the semifinals. On the last day of the tournament, Metalik defeated Zack Sabre Jr. to advance to the finals, before losing to T.J. Perkins in the finals.

Following the tournament, Metalik began working in the cruiserweight division, appearing on the Raw shows. On the September 19 episode of Raw, Metalik worked his first match on the main roster, competing in a fatal four-way match, also involving Cedric Alexander, Rich Swann, and The Brian Kendrick to determine the number one contender for the WWE Cruiserweight Championship at Clash of Champions, which Kendrick won. On the February 14, 2017 episode of 205 Live, Metalik made his debut the on the brand, defeating Drew Gulak. On the September 5 episode of 205 Live, Metalik competed in a number one contender's five-way elimination match for the Cruiserweight Championship, but was the second person eliminated from the match. On the October 31 episode of 205 Live, Metalik was part of a Halloween Fright Night Fatal Four Way match that was won by Mustafa Ali.

Lucha House Party (2018–2021)

In early 2018, WWE decided to have the three masked luchadors of the 205 Live roster, Metalik, Kalisto, and Lince Dorado, band together and become a regular team, later dubbed the Lucha House Party. As part of their gimmick, the luchadors started to carry brightly colored noisemakers and vuvuzela horns with them, using them to celebrate after a victory. They also carried a brightly colored Piñata donkey with them to the ring, which they referred to as "Penelope". Their first match as a full trio took place on January 23, 2018, episode of 205 Live, as they defeated Ariya Daivari, TJP, and Tony Nese. At the Royal Rumble, Lucha House Party defeated TJP, Drew Gulak, and Gentleman Jack Gallagher. In early 2018, WWE held a tournament for the vacant WWE Cruiserweight Championship, where Metalik was eliminated in the opening round by eventual tournament winner Cedric Alexander.

On the November 12 episode of Raw, Lucha House Party competed against a number of non-Cruiserweight teams for the first time since WWE put them together, as they competed in a battle royal against Raw tag teams such as Bobby Roode and Chad Gable, The B-Team (Bo Dallas and Curtis Axel), Heath Slater and Rhyno, The Ascension (Konnor and Viktor), and The Revival (Dash Wilder and Scott Dawson). At the Survivor Series, Lucha House Party was part of Team Raw in a five on five team elimination match, that was won by Team SmackDown. In subsequent weeks, Lucha House Party was part of a storyline with The Revival, where the latter claimed to be "tag team purists" and as such objected to Lucha House Party being allowed to compete as a tag team when there was three of them. In the following weeks, Lucha House Party defeated The Revival in various three-on-two, or three-on-one matches billed as "Lucha House Rules" matches as part of the storyline. On the February 4, 2019 episode of Raw, The Revival finally defeated Lucha House Party as part of a fatal four-way match to earn a match for the WWE Raw Tag Team Championship at a later date. In June, Lucha House Party began a feud with Lars Sullivan, with the trio losing to Sullivan via disqualification in a three-on-one handicap match at Super ShowDown. The following night on Raw, Lucha House Party was again defeated by Sullivan, this time in a three-on-one handicap elimination match. Later that month, Lucha House Party returned to 205 Live, losing to The Singh Brothers (Sunil and Samir) when the brothers cheated to win the match. The illegal actions led to a "Tornado tag team match" the following week between the two teams. Gran Metalik and Lince Dorada defeated the brothers to even the score. Metalik and Dorado were one of eight teams that competed in a Gauntlet match to determine who would get a match for the WWE Raw Tag Team Championship. Dolph Ziggler and Robert Roode won the match, with the Lucha House Party being the third team eliminated from the match. The Lucha House Party's next major show appearance was on October 31, 2019. as they participated in the World Cup Tag Team Turmoil match at the 2019 Crown Jewel show in Saudi Arabia. The duo was the first team eliminated from the match, just under six minutes after the opening bell.

On October 11, Lucha House Party was drafted to SmackDown brand as part of the 2019 WWE Draft. Their first appearance under the Smackdown brand was on November 24, as they participated in a pre-Survivor Series tag team battle royal, where they were the second team eliminated. In March 2020, Lucha House Party became involved in the WWE Smackdown Tag Team Championship picture, as they were one of six teams in a tag team Elimination Chamber match at the 2020 Elimination Chamber PPV. While the team did not win, they were able to perform several high risk, high flying moves to make them stand out. The following month Gran Metalik and Lince Dorada defeated former tag team champions The Miz and John Morrison on Smackdown as part of a storyline that led to a Fatal 4-Way championship match at the 2020 Money in the Bank show, with Lucha House Party, The Forgotten Sons and the Miz and Morrison challenging reigning champions The New Day (Big E and Kofi Kingston). On the July 24 episode of SmackDown, Metalik won a fatal four-way match to become the number one contender to the Intercontinental Championship, but failed to capture the championship after was defeated by AJ Styles the following week.

As part of the 2020 Draft in October, both Metalik and Dorado were drafted to the Raw brand, splitting them from Kalisto, who remained on the SmackDown brand. On the 30 December episode of NXT, Metalik and Dorado appeared and defeated Legado del Fantasma. He issued a challenge to NXT Cruiserweight Champion Santos Escobar following the match. Their match was scheduled for NXT: New Year's Evil with the Cruiserweight title on the line. At the event, Escobar beat Metalik. On January 13, it was announced that Dorado and Metalik would be competing in the 2021 Dusty Rhodes Tag Team Classic. They defeated Imperium in the first round, but were eliminated in the second round by Legado del Fantasma.

On September 22, it was reported that Metalik requested for his release from the company due to "lack of opportunities". On November 4, Metalik was officially released from WWE.

All Elite Wrestling (2022-present)
On 19th September 2022, Metalik (under the name Mascara Dorada) appeared on AEW Dark Elevation where he defeated Serpentico in a singles match.

Ring of Honor (2022) 
On December 10, 2022 Dorada was defeated by Jeff Cobb during the Final Battle Pre-show.

Professional wrestling style 
Whether working as Metalik, Máscara Dorada, or Gran Metalik, he generally portrays a face, the professional wrestling term for the protagonists of the storylines. He is known for performing a high-risk, high-flying version of lucha libre, exemplified by his frequent use of dives out of the wrestling ring. One such dive is the Brillo Metalik, which is a somersault suicide senton, where he leaps through the top rope and flips onto an opponent on the floor. During his time in Mexico, he used a variation of the dive known as the Brillo Dorada, where he would springboard off the second rope and jump over the top onto an opponent on the floor. Despite his accustomed style, his finishing move is a Samoan driver, where he lifts an opponent up on his shoulders before slamming them down to the ground, referred to as the Metalik Driver in WWE, and the Dorada Screwdriver previously.

Other media 
As Gran Metalik, he made his video game debut as a playable character in WWE 2K18 and has since appeared in WWE 2K19, WWE 2K20, and WWE 2K22.

Personal life 
During a 2016 interview with Lucha World, he revealed that he was the father of two young girls. His immediate family still resides in Guadalajara, Jalisco. He has relatives living in Los Angeles, California while Dorada himself lived in Mexico City. He welcomed his third daughter on November 5, 2018.

Championships and accomplishments 

 Consejo Mundial de Lucha Libre
 CMLL World Super Lightweight Championship (1 time)
 CMLL World Trios Championship (2 times) – with La Sombra and La Máscara (1) and Místico and Valiente (1)
 CMLL World Welterweight Championship (4 times)
 Mexican National Trios Championship (1 time) – with Metro and Stuka Jr.
 NWA World Historic Welterweight Championship (1 time)
 Occidente Welterweight Championship (1 time)
CMLL World Trios Championship Tournament
 CMLL Torneo Nacional de Parejas Increibles (2010, 2011) – with Atlantis
CMLL World Welterweight Championship Tournament
 Torneo Corona – with La Sombra
 CMLL Trio of the Year (2010) – with La Sombra and La Máscara
 New Japan Pro-Wrestling
 Fantastica Mania Tag Tournament (2015) – with Atlantis
Pro Wrestling Illustrated
Ranked No. 130 of the top 500 singles wrestlers in the PWI 500 in 2018
WWE
WWE 24/7 Championship (1 time)

Luchas de Apuestas record

References

External links 

 
 
 
 

1988 births
Living people
Mexican male professional wrestlers
Masked wrestlers
Unidentified wrestlers
Expatriate professional wrestlers in Japan
Professional wrestlers from Jalisco
People from Guadalajara, Jalisco
WWE 24/7 Champions
21st-century professional wrestlers
Mexican National Trios Champions
CMLL World Lightweight Champions
CMLL World Trios Champions
CMLL World Welterweight Champions
NWA World Historic Welterweight Champions